Carman Newsome (June 21, 1912 - July 17, 1974) was an African-American actor, musician and band conductor in the United States. His work includes leading roles in five Oscar Micheaux films.

Born in Kansas, he moved to Cleveland, Ohio when he was a teenager. He went to Cleveland Central High School and started a popular Cleveland Jazz band. Newsome died in Cleveland.

In 1937, Micheaux hired Newsome to handle the sales and distribution of his films. Micheaux picked Newsome as the male lead in "God's Step Children" (1938). Newsome went on to star in four more Micheaux' films.

Filmography
God's Step Children (1937) as Jimmie (adult)
Lying Lips (1938) as Benjamin Hadnott
Swing (1938) as Ted Gregory 
Birthright (1939), as Peter, a young, black Harvard graduate 
The Notorious Elinor Lee (1940), as Norman Haywood

References

Male actors from Cleveland
1912 births
1974 deaths
American male film actors
20th-century American male actors